

574001–574100 

|-bgcolor=#f2f2f2
| colspan=4 align=center | 
|}

574101–574200 

|-bgcolor=#f2f2f2
| colspan=4 align=center | 
|}

574201–574300 

|-id=300
| 574300 Curelaru ||  || Lucian Curelaru (born 1976), a Romanian amateur astronomer and software developer, who works with the European Near-Earth Asteroids Research. His interests include data mining from asteroid astrometry and binary stars observations. || 
|}

574301–574400 

|-bgcolor=#f2f2f2
| colspan=4 align=center | 
|}

574401–574500 

|-bgcolor=#f2f2f2
| colspan=4 align=center | 
|}

574501–574600 

|-id=546
| 574546 Kondorgusztáv || ||  (1825–1897) was a Hungarian astronomer, mathematician, and geodesist, as well as a member of the Hungarian Academy of Sciences. His astronomical research included celestial mechanics, astrometry and astronomical geolocation. || 
|}

574601–574700 

|-bgcolor=#f2f2f2
| colspan=4 align=center | 
|}

574701–574800 

|-bgcolor=#f2f2f2
| colspan=4 align=center | 
|}

574801–574900 

|-bgcolor=#f2f2f2
| colspan=4 align=center | 
|}

574901–575000 

|-bgcolor=#f2f2f2
| colspan=4 align=center | 
|}

References 

574001-575000